Junya Watanabe (born 1961) is a Japanese fashion designer, a protégé of Comme des Garçons designer Rei Kawakubo. He continues to work for Comme des Garcons: His atelier is located on the second floor of its Tokyo headquarters, and he produces four shows a year in Paris.

Biography
Born in Fukushima, Japan in 1961, he went on to attend Bunka Fashion College in Tokyo, graduating in 1984. At this time he began his apprenticeship at Comme des Garçons as a patternmaker.

In 1987, he was promoted to chief designer of Tricot knitwear line and then moved on to design for the Comme Des Garçons Homme line.

Starting in 1992, he has worked under his own name as part of Comme des Garçons, debuting his first at the concourse of Tokyo's Ryogoku Station the same year, starting his own line under the Comme Des Garçons name "Junya Watanabe Comme Des Garçons" in 1993 and began showing his womenswear in Paris that same year. He debuted a men's line in 2000. During the 2000-2001 Fall/Winter season, he introduced his "Techno-culture" collection, a mélange of artisanal shapes and innovative, experimental fabrics.

In 2007, Watanabe was licensed by Converse to design a series of All-Star shoes. Other collaborations include Levi's, Hervier Productions, Seil Marschall, Carhartt, Nike, Merz b. Schwanen, The North Face, ArkAir etc. In 2012, Watanabe designed the remote-control toy car The Hornet for the Tamiya Corporation, and released a matching pair of Reebok Pump (Pump Furys).

In March 2016, Watanabe created a solar-powered jacket/coat for his FW16 menswear line. In 2020, he launched a capsule collection with Brooks Brothers. He also worked with Comme des Garçons and the video game designer Yoko Taro to develop a cosplay collection.

He currently continues to work for Comme des Garcons. His atelier is located on the second floor of the Comme des Garçons headquarters in Aoyama, Tokyo.

Works
Watanabe often uses the word monozukuri to describe his work. Like his mentor Rei Kawakubo, Watanabe is renowned for designing innovative and distinctive clothing. He is particularly interested in synthetic and technologically advanced textiles and fabrics as found in his spring/summer 2001 line but also uses more traditional materials such as cotton in his spring/summer 2003 collection. He has also cited Pierre Cardin and Issey Miyake as influences.

Watanabe is often considered a "techno couture" designer, creating unusually structured clothes out of modern, technical materials. His 2015 show in Paris was criticized for his gauche use of cultural appropriation. His work is considered more practical than his mentor, Rei Kawakubo's.

He works with a team of 30 people and with an English translator.

Personal life

He keeps a very low profile, not appearing for the customary bow at the end of his runway shows, which he presents four times a year in Paris, rarely giving interviews to the press, and is reticent to talk about himself in general.

In popular culture 
Watanabe is heavily referenced in (and is the namesake for) a song by American rappers Kanye West and Playboi Carti, titled "Junya", from West's 2021 album Donda.

References

External links

All of the collections, Vogue.com

Living people
1961 births
Japanese fashion designers
Clothing brands of Japan
People from Fukushima Prefecture